Wesley Methodist Church is a historic church at 1727 Gervais Street in Columbia, South Carolina.

It was built in 1911 and added to the National Register in 2009.

References

Methodist churches in South Carolina
Churches on the National Register of Historic Places in South Carolina
Gothic Revival church buildings in South Carolina
Churches completed in 1911
20th-century Methodist church buildings in the United States
Churches in Columbia, South Carolina
National Register of Historic Places in Columbia, South Carolina